Jones Chapel is an unincorporated community in Cullman County, Alabama, United States, located on Alabama State Route 74,  west-northwest of Cullman.

History
Jones Chapel is named after a local church, which itself was named in honor of "Turkeytail" Jones, an early settler of the area. Turkeytail Jones owned, and operated a trading post at the center of the community. He traded goods with the local Native American tribes for furs.

A post office operated under the name Jones Chapel from 1868 to 1907.

References

Unincorporated communities in Cullman County, Alabama
Unincorporated communities in Alabama